Nord-Hålogaland is a diocese in the Church of Norway. It covers the Church of Norway churches in Troms og Finnmark county as well as in the territory of Svalbard.  The diocese is seated in the city of Tromsø at the Tromsø Cathedral, the seat of the presiding bishop, Olav Øygard (bishop since 2014).

History
Originally, this area was a part of the great Diocese of Nidaros, which covered all of Northern Norway from Romsdalen and north (Finnmark, Troms, and Nordland counties). On 30 December 1803, the King of Norway named Peder Olivarius Bugge the "Bishop of Trondheim and Romsdal" and also named Mathias Bonsach Krogh the "Bishop of Nordland and Finnmark", thus essentially splitting the diocese into two starting in 1804, although legally it was one diocese with two bishops.  The newly appointed Bishop Krogh (in 1804) made Alstahaug Church the seat of his bishopric in the north, while Bishop Bugge stayed in Trondheim. The new diocese was legally created on 14 June 1844 as Tromsø stift and it was to be seated in the city of Tromsø.  The new Tromsø Cathedral was completed in 1864.  The name of the diocese was changed to Hålogaland bispedømme in 1918.  When Svalbard became part of Norway in 1920, it also became a part of this diocese.  In 1952, the Diocese of Hålogaland was split into two: the Diocese of Sør-Hålogaland (Nordland county) and the Diocese of Nord-Hålogaland (Troms, Finnmark, and Svalbard).

Bishops

The Bishops of the Diocese of Nord-Hålogaland since its creation in 1952 when it was split off from the Diocese of Hålogaland:
1952-1961: Alf Wiig
1962-1972: Monrad Norderval
1972-1979: Kristen Kyrre Bremer
1979-1990: Arvid Nergård
1990-2001: Ola Steinholt
2002-2014: Per Oskar Kjølaas
Since 2014: Olav Øygard

Cathedral

Construction of the new Tromsø Cathedral began in 1861. It was designed by architect Christian Heinrich Grosch. The cathedral was built of wood in Neo-Gothic style. The interior is dominated by the altar, a copy of the Resurrection by Adolph Tidemand.

Structure
The Diocese of Nord-Hålogaland is divided into nine deaneries.  Each one corresponds to several municipalities in the diocese.  Each municipality is further divided into one or more parishes which each contain one or more congregations.  See each municipality below for lists of churches and parishes within them.

Media gallery

References

External links
Diocese of Nord-Hålogaland website
Tromsø Cathedral picture gallery

Nord-Haalogaland
Organisations based in Tromsø
Religious organizations established in 1804
Troms og Finnmark
Finnmark
Troms
1804 establishments in Norway